Tolulope "Jordan" Omogbehin (born May 16, 1994) is a Nigerian-American professional wrestler and former college basketball player. He is currently signed to WWE, where he performs on the Raw brand under the ring name Omos. He is one of the tallest and heaviest wrestlers of all time. 

In the history of WWE, he is the first and currently only Nigerian born to ever be signed by the WWE and has established himself as one of the WWE greatest professional wrestlers from Africa.

In the course of his career as a college basketball player, he played for the University of South Florida and for the Morgan State University from 2014 to 2015. Omogbehin signed with WWE in January 2019 and became a one-time Raw Tag Team Champion with AJ Styles in 2021.

Early life
Omogbehin was born on May 16, 1994, in Lagos, Nigeria. He was sent to the United States on a scholarship alone when he was just fifteen with his family staying in Nigeria, though he has an older brother that lives in Indiana. Omogbehin attended and graduated from Atlantic Shores Christian School in Chesapeake, Virginia, and through high school, he played basketball and continued in the sport after choosing to attend the University of South Florida where he played at the center position. While at university in 2012, he was diagnosed with a pituitary tumour by university doctors who also diagnosed gigantism. The tumour was pressed against his optical nerves and without surgery, he would have gone blind, had a cardiac arrest, or had a heart attack. Following the tumour's removal, his body no longer produces testosterone and he has to take external supplements. Omogbehin claims to have met basketball legend Hakeem Olajuwon during the USF Bulls' team trip to Houston, Texas in 2014. Omogbehin also played basketball at Morgan State University in Baltimore, Maryland after transferring from USF; he played center for the Morgan State Bears from 2014 to 2015.

Professional wrestling career

WWE

Training and debut (2019–2020) 
It was reported on January 1, 2019, that WWE signed Omogbehin with six other athletes to train at the WWE Performance Center. On July 18, 2019, Omogbehin made his in-ring debut during a July 18 house show, defeating team 2.0 in a two-on-one handicap match. He would keep wrestling on house shows during the following months. On June 15, 2020, he made his television debut during the episode of Monday Night Raw, where he was presented as a surprise member of Akira Tozawa's ninja faction. Appearing as the tallest member of the faction, Omogbehin was referred to only as the "Giant Ninja" as he stood at ringside during team Tozawa's tag match against The Street Profits and The Viking Raiders, however, he would be repackaged as a bodyguard shortly thereafter, serving as the doorman and bouncer for Shane McMahon's Raw Underground.

Alliance with AJ Styles (2020–2021) 

In October 2020, after the cancellation of Raw Underground, Omogbehin began associating with AJ Styles, thus establishing himself as a heel. At Survivor Series, Omogbehin was introduced with a new ring name, Omos. At TLC: Tables, Ladders and Chairs, Omos was involved in the WWE Championship match with the eponymous stipulation, preventing The Miz from reaching the title and dropping him onto a table placed outside the ring before chasing John Morrison to the back. At Royal Rumble, during the 2021 Royal Rumble match, Omos involved himself by preventing AJ Styles from being eliminated on a few occasions. Omos eliminated Big E and Rey Mysterio despite not being in the match. He would also go on to help Styles enter the Elimination Chamber match early before being ejected by WWE official Adam Pearce.

On the March 15, 2021, episode of Raw, Omos announced that he would be making his televised in-ring debut at WrestleMania 37 alongside Styles against The New Day (Kofi Kingston and Xavier Woods) for the WWE Raw Tag Team Championship. At the event, Omos and Styles defeated The New Day to win the titles, after Omos hit Kingston with a choke bomb and pinned him. At SummerSlam, Omos and Styles lost the Raw Tag Team Championship to RK-Bro (Randy Orton and Riddle). At Extreme Rules, Omos and Styles teamed with Bobby Lashley to take on The New Day in a 6-man tag team match, in which Styles, Omos and Lashley lost. After this, it was announced that Styles and Omos would face RK-Bro in a rematch for the tag team titles at Crown Jewel. At the event, they failed to regain the titles.

At Survivor Series on November 21, 2021, Omos participated in a 25-man dual-branded battle royal in honor of the 25th anniversary of The Rock's debut at the 1996 Survivor Series. Omos had the most eliminations at 12 and won the match by last eliminating Ricochet. After weeks of tension between him and Styles, on the December 20, 2021, episode of Raw, Omos refused to tag into their match against Rey Mysterio and Dominik Mysterio, ultimately costing them the match. A fight broke out between the two, effectively ending their alliance when Omos turned on a now face AJ Styles.

Alliance with MVP (2022–present) 
On the January 3, 2022, episode of Raw, a week after splitting up from Styles, a match was set up between the two, where Omos defeated Styles. On January 29, at the Royal Rumble, Omos entered the namesake match for the first time in his career at number 11, where he eliminated Montez Ford, Angelo Dawkins, and Damian Priest before he was eliminated by Styles, Austin Theory, Chad Gable, Dominik Mysterio, Ricochet, and Ridge Holland. On Night 2 of WrestleMania 38, he faced Bobby Lashley in a losing effort, marking his first pinfall loss in WWE. On the April 4 episode of Raw, Omos would begin feuding with Lashley and acquired a new manager in MVP, who had turned on Lashley, thus forming an alliance between the two. He defeated Lashley at WrestleMania Backlash with MVP’s help, but lost to him in a steel cage match on the May 16 episode of Raw. At Hell in a Cell, Omos and MVP lost to Lashley in a 2-on-1 handicap match, ending their feud.

On the June 20 episode of Raw, Omos would qualify for the Men’s Money in the Bank ladder match after defeating Riddle. At the event, he would fail at winning the match after being thrown through the announce table by all the other competitors.

On the October 14 episode of SmackDown, Omos confronted to Braun Strowman, starting a feud between the two. At Crown Jewel on November 5, Omos lost to Strowman. At the Royal Rumble on January 28, 2023 Omos entered the Royal Rumble match at #26 but was eliminated by Strowman.

Personal life 
Omogbehin is fluent in English, French and Yoruba.

Other media 
Omos made his video game debut as a playable character in WWE 2K22, and since then has appeared in WWE Supercard, WWE Mayhem, WWE Champions, and WWE 2k23.

Championships and accomplishments
Pro Wrestling Illustrated
Ranked No. 120 of the top 500 singles wrestlers in the PWI 500 in 2022
WWE
WWE Raw Tag Team Championship (1 time) – with AJ Styles
The Rock 25th Anniversary Battle Royal (2021)

References

External links
 
 
USF Bulls Team Profile
Morgan State Bears Team Profile

 

1994 births
African-American male professional wrestlers
American male professional wrestlers
American sportspeople of Nigerian descent
Living people
Morgan State Bears men's basketball players
Nigerian emigrants to the United States
Nigerian men's basketball players
Sportspeople from Lagos
South Florida Bulls men's basketball players
21st-century African-American sportspeople
Sportspeople from Chesapeake, Virginia
Basketball players from Virginia
Professional wrestlers from Virginia
21st-century professional wrestlers